Agyneta fillmorana is a species of sheet weaver found in Canada and the United States. It was described by Chamberlin in 1919.

References

fillmorana
Spiders of North America
Spiders described in 1919